Straight Creek is a stream entirely within Brown County, Ohio. It is a tributary of the Ohio River.

Despite its name, Straight Creek is straight in "name only".

See also
List of rivers of Ohio

References

Rivers of Brown County, Ohio
Rivers of Ohio